Head of the Family is an American 1996 B movie black comedy released by Full Moon Features. It concerns a Southern couple who blackmail a family of mutants to get money and revenge.

Plot
Howard (Gordon Jennison Noice) is the meanest nastiest thug in town, a Harley riding criminal with a hot wife named Loretta (Jacqueline Lovell). Loretta's problem is that she is having an affair with Lance (Blake Adams), owner of the town diner and Howard is getting suspicious.

Driving back from one of their nightly flings, Lance witnesses the local family of weirdos, the Stackpools, dragging a man from his truck and into their house. Seeing this as an opportunity, Lance discovers the Stackpools' terrible secret. They are quadruplets, and each was born with one exaggerated human faculty: One is extremely strong, one has extremely well-developed senses, one is extremely attractive (Alexandria Quinn), and one is extremely intelligent. The whole family is run by the intelligent one, the titular "head of the family": Myron (J.W. Perra). Little more than a giant head with hands in a wheelchair, Myron psychically controls his other siblings, but seeks more. When idiotic locals fall for his trap, he experiments on their brains, trying to find a normal body to house his superior intellect.

Lance blackmails the Stackpools with their secret, getting them to kill Howard. He also demands $2,000 a week in cash, since the Stackpools are rich in oil and coal, among other things. Eventually Myron tires of Lance's bottom-feeding, and captures him and Loretta, to get them to destroy the evidence of their secret. To force Lance's hand, he puts Loretta in a mock play of Joan of Arc in the basement, complete with a burning at the stake. The dumb strong one, seeing the "pretty girl" in trouble, carries her off before she can be hurt, and burns the house down. With the Stackpools and Lance dead, the ever scheming Loretta realizes that the big dumb one is the heir to the family riches. She marries him, inheriting all the Stackpool fortunes. The ending, however, suggests that Myron is still alive and is controlling the dumb one again....

Sequel
On February 14, 2020 "Bride of the Head of Family " finally got its release. It was released as a part of the "Deadly Ten" series and was directed by Charles Band. The plot of the film follows the events that happened in the previous film. Myron Stackpool must attempt to rebuild his empire from the ground up once again. "But finding his lost fortune and missing siblings is only a fraction of his woes, as a mysterious high-powered woman arrives on the scene. Her name is Eugenia, and she sports a BIG agenda and an even BIGGER head! It is love at first sight for Myron, but before he and his newly betrothed can exchange vows, they will have to deal with mad doctors, deformed hit men, sexual orderlies, and more - as they all race to the wedding of - the BRIDE OF THE HEAD OF THE FAMILY!"

References

External links

1990s black comedy films
Full Moon Features films
Films directed by Charles Band
Puppet films
1996 direct-to-video films
1996 films
Films scored by Richard Band
Adultery in films
Films about families
1990s English-language films